Sogndal, Sokndal, or Soknedal are similarly sounding Norwegian place names.  They may refer to:

Places

Norway

Rogaland county
Sokndal, a municipality in Rogaland county (historically spelled Sogndal)
Sogndal, Rogaland, a former municipality in Rogaland county
Sogndalsstranda, a small seaport in Sokndal municipality in Rogaland county (historically spelled Sogndal)
Sokndal Church, a church in Sokndal municipality in Rogaland county

Trøndelag county
Soknedal, a village in Midtre Gauldal municipality in Trøndelag county
Soknedal (municipality), a former municipality in Trøndelag county (historically spelled Soknedalen or Sognedalen)
Soknedal Church, a church in Midtre Gauldal municipality in Trøndelag county

Vestland county
Sogndal, a municipality in Vestland county
Sogndal Airport, Haukåsen, an airport in Sogndal municipality in Vestland county
Sogndal Folk High School, a folk high school in Sogndal municipality in Vestland county

Other uses
Sogndal Fotball, an association football team in Sogndal municipality in Sogn og Fjordane county, Norway
Sogndal IL, a Norwegian alliance sports club from Sogndalsfjøra, Sogn og Fjordane county, Norway